The 2019 Blancpain GT Series was the last season under the title of the Blancpain GT Series. The season began on 14 April at Monza and ended on 29 September in Barcelona. The season features ten rounds, five Endurance Cup rounds and five World Challenge Europe rounds. The overall championship was won by Chinese Lamborghini factory team FFF Racing and their drivers, Andrea Caldarelli and Marco Mapelli.

Calendar
At the annual press conference during the 2018 24 Hours of Spa on 27 July, the Stéphane Ratel Organisation announced the first draft of the 2019 calendar. The Endurance Cup round in Barcelona would become a World Challenge Europe round, replacing the round at the Nürburgring. Zolder was initially dropped from the schedule in favor of the Red Bull Ring, before the Austrian Grand Prix venue was replaced by Zandvoort in the final draft of the calendar released on 22 October. Barcelona and the Nürburgring were once again swapped around, making the latter circuit the host of a World Challenge Europe round.

Race results
Bold indicates overall winner.

Championship standings
Scoring system
Championship points are awarded for the first ten positions in each race. The pole-sitter also receives one point and entries are required to complete 75% of the winning car's race distance in order to be classified and earn points. Individual drivers are required to participate for a minimum of 25 minutes in order to earn championship points in any race.

World Challenge Europe Race points

Endurance Cup Race points

1000 km Paul Ricard points

24 Hours of Spa points
Points were awarded after six hours, after twelve hours and at the finish.

Drivers' championships

Overall

Silver Cup

Pro-Am Cup

Notes

1 – Charlie Eastwood, Ahmad Al Harthy and Salih Yoluç lost the point for Pole position after a breach of article 19.6, after the gantry camera card was not submitted in time.

Teams' championships

Overall

Silver Cup

Pro-Am Cup

Notes

 1 – Oman Racing with TF Sport lost the point for Pole position after a breach of article 19.6, after the gantry camera card was not submitted in time.

See also
2019 Blancpain GT Series Endurance Cup
2019 Blancpain GT World Challenge Europe
2019 Blancpain GT World Challenge Asia
2019 Blancpain GT World Challenge America

References

External links

 
GT World Challenge Europe
2019 in motorsport